The flag of Zakynthos, Greece, or Flag of Zante, has a dark green background with an orange depiction of Zakynthos, the mytho-historical first resident of the island and its namesake, in the centre. Zakynthos, partially draped in a robe, is sitting on rock holding a semi-coiled snake to the right. Zakynthos (ΖΑΚΥΝΘΟΣ) is written to the upper right of the man, with the island's motto "Freedom needs virtue and courage" (ΘΕΛΕΙ ΑΡΕΤΗ ΚΑΙ TOΛMH
Η ΕΛΕΥΘΕΡΙΑ - théli aretí ke tólmi i elefthería) under the man, both written in all caps in Greek and in the same colour as the central image. The flag flies throughout the island and is flown above every public building, often in tandem with the national flag of Greece.

Flags of Greece
Flag